Patritumab (INN) is a human monoclonal antibody designed for the treatment of cancer. It acts as an immunomodulator.

Clinical trials
It is in a phase 2 clinical trial for squamous cell cancer of the head and neck.

It is to be included in a new arm of the I-SPY 2 breast cancer trial.

References 

Monoclonal antibodies for tumors
Experimental cancer drugs